This is a list of the bird species recorded in Mexico. The avifauna of Mexico included a total of 1135 species as of July 2022, according to Bird Checklists of the World.  Of the 1135 species, 112 are rare or accidental, 10 have been introduced by humans, 112 are endemic, and five more breed only in Mexico though their non-breeding range is larger. Four species are known to be extinct, 68 are globally vulnerable or endangered, and three of the latter might also be extinct. The total figure includes a number of species which are known only from sight records; they are listed but not especially noted.

This list is presented in the taxonomic sequence of the Check-list of North and Middle American Birds, 7th edition through the 63rd Supplement, published by the American Ornithological Society (AOS). Common and scientific names are also those of the Check-list, except that the common names of families are from the Clements taxonomy because the AOS list does not include them.

Unless otherwise noted, the species on this list are considered to occur regularly in Mexico as permanent residents, summer or winter visitors, or migrants. The following tags have been used to highlight several categories. The tags and notes of population status are from Bird Checklists of the World.

(A) Accidental - a species that rarely or accidentally occurs in Mexico
(E) Endemic - a species endemic to Mexico
(I) Introduced - a species introduced to Mexico as a consequence, direct or indirect, of human actions

Tinamous

Order: TinamiformesFamily: Tinamidae

The tinamous are one of the most ancient groups of bird. Although they look similar to other ground-dwelling birds like quail and grouse, they have no close relatives and are classified as a single family, Tinamidae, within their own order, the Tinamiformes. They are distantly related to the ratites (order Struthioniformes), that includes the rheas, emus, and kiwis.

Great tinamou, Tinamus major (Near-threatened)
Little tinamou, Crypturellus soui
Thicket tinamou, Crypturellus cinnamomeus
Slaty-breasted tinamou, Crypturellus boucardi

Ducks, geese, and waterfowl

Order: AnseriformesFamily: Anatidae

Anatidae includes the ducks and most duck-like waterfowl, such as geese and swans. These birds are adapted to an aquatic existence with webbed feet, flattened bills, and feathers that are excellent at shedding water due to an oily coating.

Black-bellied whistling-duck, Dendrocygna autumnalis
Fulvous whistling-duck, Dendrocygna bicolor
Snow goose, Anser caerulescens
Ross's goose, Anser rossii
Greater white-fronted goose, Anser albifrons
Brant, Branta bernicla
Cackling goose, Branta hutchinsii
Canada goose, Branta canadensis
Trumpeter swan, Cygnus buccinator (A) extirpated
Tundra swan, Cygnus columbianus
Muscovy duck, Cairina moschata
Wood duck, Aix sponsa
Garganey, Spatula querquedula (A)
Blue-winged teal, Spatula discors
Cinnamon teal, Spatula cyanoptera
Northern shoveler, Spatula clypeata
Gadwall, Mareca strepera
Eurasian wigeon, Mareca penelope
American wigeon, Mareca americana
Mallard, Anas platyrhynchos
Mexican duck, Anas diazi
Mottled duck, Anas fulvigula
Northern pintail, Anas acuta
Green-winged teal, Anas crecca
Canvasback, Aythya valisineria
Redhead, Aythya americana
Ring-necked duck, Aythya collaris
Greater scaup, Aythya marila
Lesser scaup, Aythya affinis
Harlequin duck, Histrionicus histrionicus (A)
Surf scoter, Melanitta perspicillata
White-winged scoter, Melanitta deglandi
Black scoter, Melanitta americana (Near-threatened)
Long-tailed duck, Clangula hyemalis (A) (Vulnerable)
Bufflehead, Bucephala albeola
Common goldeneye, Bucephala clangula
Barrow's goldeneye, Bucephala islandica (A)
Hooded merganser, Lophodytes cucullatus
Common merganser, Mergus merganser
Red-breasted merganser, Mergus serrator
Masked duck, Nomonyx dominicus
Ruddy duck, Oxyura jamaicensis

Guans, chachalacas, and curassows
Order: GalliformesFamily: Cracidae

The Cracidae are large birds, similar in general appearance to turkeys. The guans and curassows live in trees, but the smaller chachalacas are found in more open scrubby habitats. They are generally dull-plumaged, but the curassows and some guans have colorful facial ornaments.

Plain chachalaca, Ortalis vetula
Rufous-bellied chachalaca, Ortalis wagleri (E)
West Mexican chachalaca, Ortalis poliocephala (E)
White-bellied chachalaca, Ortalis leucogastra
Crested guan, Penelope purpurascens
Highland guan, Penelopina nigra (Vulnerable)
Horned guan, Oreophasis derbianus (Endangered)
Great curassow, Crax rubra (Vulnerable)

New World quail
Order: GalliformesFamily: Odontophoridae

The New World quail are small, plump terrestrial birds only distantly related to the quails of the Old World, but named for their similar appearance and habits. Mexico has the greatest diversity of this family of any country.

Mountain quail, Oreortyx pictus
Buffy-crowned wood-partridge, Dendrortyx leucophrys
Long-tailed wood-partridge, Dendrortyx macroura (E)
Bearded wood-partridge, Dendrortyx barbatus (E) (Vulnerable)
Banded quail, Philortyx fasciatus (E)
Northern bobwhite, Colinus virginianus (Near-threatened)
Black-throated bobwhite, Colinus nigrogularis
Scaled quail, Callipepla squamata
Elegant quail, Callipepla douglasii (E)
California quail, Callipepla californica
Gambel's quail, Callipepla gambelii
Montezuma quail, Cyrtonyx montezumae
Ocellated quail, Cyrtonyx ocellatus (Vulnerable)
Singing quail, Dactylortyx thoracicus
Spotted wood-quail, Odontophorus guttatus

Pheasants, grouse, and allies
Order: GalliformesFamily: Phasianidae

Turkeys are similar to large pheasants but have a distinctive fleshy wattle that hangs from the beak, called a snood.

Wild turkey, Meleagris gallopavo
Ocellated turkey, Meleagris ocellata (Near-threatened)
Ring-necked pheasant, Phasianus colchicus (I)

Flamingos
Order: PhoenicopteriformesFamily: Phoenicopteridae

Flamingos filter-feed on shellfish and algae. Their oddly shaped beaks are specially adapted to separate mud and silt from the food they consume and, uniquely, are used upside-down.

American flamingo, Phoenicopterus ruber

Grebes

Order: PodicipediformesFamily: Podicipedidae

Grebes are small to medium-large freshwater diving birds. They have lobed toes and are excellent swimmers and divers. However, they have their feet placed far back on the body, making them quite ungainly on land.

Least grebe, Tachybaptus dominicus
Pied-billed grebe, Podilymbus podiceps
Horned grebe, Podiceps auritus (Vulnerable)
Red-necked grebe, Podiceps grisegena (A)
Eared grebe, Podiceps nigricollis
Western grebe, Aechmophorus occidentalis
Clark's grebe, Aechmophorus clarkii

Pigeons and doves

Order: ColumbiformesFamily: Columbidae

Pigeons and doves are stout-bodied birds with short necks and short slender bills with a fleshy cere.

Rock pigeon, Columba livia (I)
Pale-vented pigeon, Patagioenas cayennensis
Scaled pigeon, Patagioenas speciosa
White-crowned pigeon, Patagioenas leucocephala (Near-threatened)
Red-billed pigeon, Patagioenas flavirostris
Band-tailed pigeon, Patagioenas fasciata
Short-billed pigeon, Patagioenas nigrirostris
African collared-dove, Streptopelia roseogrisea (I)
Eurasian collared-dove, Streptopelia decaocto (I)
Spotted dove, Spilopelia chinensis (I)
Passenger pigeon, Ectopistes migratorius (Extinct)
Inca dove, Columbina inca
Common ground dove, Columbina passerina
Plain-breasted ground dove, Columbina minuta
Ruddy ground dove, Columbina talpacoti
Blue ground dove, Claravis pretiosa
Maroon-chested ground dove, Paraclaravis mondetoura
Ruddy quail-dove, Geotrygon montana
White-tipped dove, Leptotila verreauxi
Caribbean dove, Leptotila jamaicensis
Gray-chested dove, Leptotila cassinii
Gray-headed dove, Leptotila plumbeiceps
Tuxtla quail-dove, Zentrygon carrikeri (E) (Endangered)
White-faced quail-dove, Zentrygon albifacies
White-winged dove, Zenaida asiatica
Zenaida dove, Zenaida aurita
Mourning dove, Zenaida macroura
Socorro dove, Zenaida graysoni (E) (Extinct in the wild)

Cuckoos
Order: CuculiformesFamily: Cuculidae

The family Cuculidae includes cuckoos, roadrunners, and anis. These birds are of variable size with slender bodies, long tails, and strong legs.

Smooth-billed ani, Crotophaga ani
Groove-billed ani, Crotophaga sulcirostris
Striped cuckoo, Tapera naevia
Pheasant cuckoo, Dromococcyx phasianellus
Lesser ground-cuckoo, Morococcyx erythropygus
Lesser roadrunner, Geococcyx velox
Greater roadrunner, Geococcyx californianus
Squirrel cuckoo, Piaya cayana
Yellow-billed cuckoo, Coccyzus americanus
Mangrove cuckoo, Coccyzus minor
Black-billed cuckoo, Coccyzus erythropthalmus

Nightjars and allies
Order: CaprimulgiformesFamily: Caprimulgidae

Nightjars are medium-sized nocturnal birds that usually nest on the ground. They have long wings, short legs, and very short bills. Most have small feet, of little use for walking, and long pointed wings. Their soft plumage is camouflaged to resemble bark or leaves.

Short-tailed nighthawk, Lurocalis semitorquatus
Lesser nighthawk, Chordeiles acutipennis
Common nighthawk, Chordeiles minor
Common pauraque, Nyctidromus albicollis
Common poorwill, Phalaenoptilus nuttallii
Eared poorwill, Nyctiphrynus mcleodii (E)
Yucatan poorwill, Nyctiphrynus yucatanicus
Chuck-will's-widow, Antrostomus carolinensis (Near-threatened)
Tawny-collared nightjar, Antrostomus salvini (E)
Yucatan nightjar, Antrostomus badius
Buff-collared nightjar, Antrostomus ridgwayi
Eastern whip-poor-will, Antrostomus vociferus (Near-threatened)
Mexican whip-poor-will, Antrostomus arizonae
Spot-tailed nightjar, Hydropsalis maculicaudus

Potoos
Order: NyctibiiformesFamily: Nyctibiidae

The potoos (sometimes called poor-me-ones) are large near passerine birds related to the nightjars and frogmouths. They are nocturnal insectivores which lack the bristles around the mouth found in the true nightjars.

Great potoo, Nyctibius grandis
Northern potoo, Nyctibius jamaicensis

Swifts
Order: ApodiformesFamily: Apodidae

Swifts are small birds which spend the majority of their lives flying. These birds have very short legs and never settle voluntarily on the ground, perching instead only on vertical surfaces. Many swifts have long swept-back wings which resemble a crescent or boomerang.

Black swift, Cypseloides niger (Vulnerable)
White-fronted swift, Cypseloides storeri (E) (Population data deficient)
Chestnut-collared swift, Streptoprocne rutila
White-collared swift, Streptoprocne zonaris
White-naped swift, Streptoprocne semicollaris (E)
Chimney swift, Chaetura pelagica (Vulnerable)
Vaux's swift, Chaetura vauxi
White-throated swift, Aeronautes saxatalis
Lesser swallow-tailed swift, Panyptila cayennensis
Great swallow-tailed swift, Panyptila sanctihieronymi

Hummingbirds

Order: ApodiformesFamily: Trochilidae

Hummingbirds are small birds capable of hovering in mid-air due to the rapid flapping of their wings. They are the only birds that can fly backwards.

White-necked jacobin, Florisuga mellivora
Mexican hermit, Phaethornis mexicanus
Long-billed hermit, Phaethornis longirostris
Stripe-throated hermit, Phaethornis striigularis
Mexican violetear, Colibri thalassinus
Purple-crowned fairy, Heliothryx barroti
Green-breasted mango, Anthracothorax prevostii
Short-crested coquette, Lophornis brachylophus (E) (Critically endangered)
Black-crested coquette, Lophornis helenae
Rivoli's hummingbird, Eugenes fulgens
Long-billed starthroat, Heliomaster longirostris
Plain-capped starthroat, Heliomaster constantii
Green-throated mountain-gem, Lampornis viridipallens
Amethyst-throated mountain-gem, Lampornis amethystinus
Blue-throated mountain-gem, Lampornis clemenciae
Garnet-throated hummingbird, Lamprolaima rhami
Slender sheartail, Doricha enicura
Mexican sheartail, Doricha eliza (E) (Near-threatened)
Sparkling-tailed hummingbird, Tilmatura dupontii
Lucifer hummingbird, Calothorax lucifer
Beautiful hummingbird, Calothorax pulcher (E)
Ruby-throated hummingbird, Archilochus colubris
Black-chinned hummingbird, Archilochus alexandri
Anna's hummingbird, Calypte anna
Costa's hummingbird, Calypte costae
Bumblebee hummingbird, Atthis heloisa (E)
Wine-throated hummingbird, Atthis ellioti
Calliope hummingbird, Selasphorus calliope
Rufous hummingbird, Selasphorus rufus (Near-threatened)
Allen's hummingbird, Selasphorus sasin
Broad-tailed hummingbird, Selasphorus platycercus
Dusky hummingbird, Phaeoptila sordidus (E)
Broad-billed hummingbird, Cynanthus latirostris
Tres Marias hummingbird, Cynanthus lawrencei (E)
Golden-crowned emerald, Cynanthus auriceps (E)
Turquoise-crowned hummingbird, Cynanthus doubledayi (E)
Cozumel emerald, Cynanthus forficatus (E)
Canivet's emerald, Cynanthus canivetii
White-eared hummingbird, Basilinna leucotis
Xantus's hummingbird, Basilinna xantusii (E)
Wedge-tailed sabrewing, Pampa curvipennis
Long-tailed sabrewing, Pampa excellens (E)
Rufous sabrewing, Pampa rufa
Emerald-chinned hummingbird, Abeillia abeillei
Violet sabrewing, Campylopterus hemileucurus
Mexican woodnymph, Eupherusa ridgwayi (E) (Vulnerable)
White-tailed hummingbird, Eupherusa poliocerca (E) (Vulnerable)
Blue-capped hummingbird, Eupherusa cyanophrys (E) (Endangered)
Stripe-tailed hummingbird, Eupherusa eximia
Scaly-breasted hummingbird, Phaeochroa cuvierii
Violet-crowned hummingbird, Ramosomyia violiceps
Green-fronted hummingbird, Ramosomyia viridifrons
Azure-crowned hummingbird, Saucerottia cyanocephala
Berylline hummingbird, Saucerottia beryllina
Blue-tailed hummingbird, Saucerottia cyanura
Cinnamon hummingbird, Amazilia rutila
Buff-bellied hummingbird, Amazilia yucatanensis
Rufous-tailed hummingbird, Amazilia tzacatl
White-bellied emerald, Chlorestes candida
Blue-throated goldentail, Chlorestes eliciae

Rails, gallinules, and coots

Order: GruiformesFamily: Rallidae

Rallidae is a large family of small to medium-sized birds which includes the rails, crakes, coots, and gallinules. Typically they inhabit dense vegetation in damp environments near lakes, swamps, or rivers. In general they are shy and secretive birds, making them difficult to observe. Most species have strong legs and long toes which are well adapted to soft uneven surfaces. They tend to have short, rounded wings and to be weak fliers.

Spotted rail, Pardirallus maculatus
Uniform crake, Amaurolimnas concolor
Rufous-necked wood-rail, Aramides axillaris
Russet-naped wood-rail, Aramides albiventris
Ridgway's rail, Rallus obsoletus (Near-threatened)
Clapper rail, Rallus crepitans
Aztec rail, Rallus tenuirostris (E) (Near-threatened)
King rail, Rallus elegans (Near-threatened)
Virginia rail, Rallus limicola
Sora, Porzana carolina
Common gallinule, Gallinula galeata
American coot, Fulica americana (A)
Purple gallinule, Porphyrio martinicus
Yellow rail, Coturnicops noveboracensis (A)
Yellow-breasted crake, Hapalocrex flaviventer
Ruddy crake, Laterallus ruber
Gray-breasted crake, Laterallus exilis
Black rail, Laterallus jamaicensis

Finfoots
Order: GruiformesFamily: Heliornithidae

Heliornithidae is a small family of tropical birds with webbed lobes on their feet similar to those of grebes and coots.

Sungrebe, Heliornis fulica

Limpkin
Order: GruiformesFamily: Aramidae

The limpkin resembles a large rail. It has drab-brown plumage and a grayer head and neck.

Limpkin, Aramus guarauna

Cranes
Order: GruiformesFamily: Gruidae

Cranes are large, long-legged, and long-necked birds. Unlike the similar-looking but unrelated herons, cranes fly with necks outstretched, not pulled back. Most have elaborate and noisy courting displays or "dances".

Sandhill crane, Antigone canadensis
Whooping crane, Grus americana (A) (Endangered) (extirpated)

Thick-knees
Order: CharadriiformesFamily: Burhinidae

The thick-knees are a group of largely tropical waders in the family Burhinidae. They are found worldwide within the tropical zone, with some species also breeding in temperate Europe and Australia. They are medium to large waders with strong black or yellow-black bills, large yellow eyes, and cryptic plumage. Despite being classed as waders, most species have a preference for arid or semi-arid habitats.

Double-striped thick-knee, Burhinus bistriatus

Stilts and avocets
Order: CharadriiformesFamily: Recurvirostridae

Recurvirostridae is a family of large wading birds which includes the avocets and stilts. The avocets have long legs and long up-curved bills. The stilts have extremely long legs and long, thin, straight bills.

Black-necked stilt, Himantopus mexicanus
American avocet, Recurvirostra americana

Oystercatchers
Order: CharadriiformesFamily: Haematopodidae

The oystercatchers are large and noisy plover-like birds with strong bills used for smashing or prying open molluscs.

American oystercatcher, Haematopus palliatus
Black oystercatcher, Haematopus bachmani

Plovers and lapwings
Order: CharadriiformesFamily: Charadriidae

The family Charadriidae includes the plovers, dotterels, and lapwings. They are small to medium-sized birds with compact bodies, short thick necks, and long, usually pointed, wings. They are found in open country worldwide, mostly in habitats near water.

Southern lapwing, Vanellus chilensis (A)
Black-bellied plover, Pluvialis squatarola
American golden-plover, Pluvialis dominica
Pacific golden-plover, Pluvialis fulva
Eurasian dotterel, Charadrius morinellus (A)
Killdeer, Charadrius vociferus
Semipalmated plover, Charadrius semipalmatus
Piping plover, Charadrius melodus (Near-threatened)
Wilson's plover, Charadrius wilsonia
Collared plover, Charadrius collaris
Snowy plover, Charadrius nivosus (Near-threatened)
Mountain plover, Charadrius montanus (Near-threatened)

Jacanas
Order: CharadriiformesFamily: Jacanidae

The jacanas are a family of waders which are found throughout the tropics. They are identifiable by their huge feet and claws which enable them to walk on floating vegetation in the shallow lakes that are their preferred habitat.

Northern jacana, Jacana spinosa

Sandpipers and allies

Order: CharadriiformesFamily: Scolopacidae

Scolopacidae is a large diverse family of small to medium-sized shorebirds including the sandpipers, curlews, godwits, shanks, tattlers, woodcocks, snipes, dowitchers, and phalaropes. The majority of these species eat small invertebrates picked out of the mud or soil. Variation in length of legs and bills enables multiple species to feed in the same habitat, particularly on the coast, without direct competition for food.

Upland sandpiper, Bartramia longicauda
Whimbrel, Numenius phaeopus
Eskimo curlew, Numenius borealis (A) (Critically endangered, possibly extinct) 
Long-billed curlew, Numenius americanus
Bar-tailed godwit, Limosa lapponica (A) (Near-threatened)
Hudsonian godwit, Limosa haemastica (A)
Marbled godwit, Limosa fedoa
Ruddy turnstone, Arenaria interpres
Black turnstone, Arenaria melanocephala
Red knot, Calidris canutus (Near-threatened)
Surfbird, Calidris virgata
Ruff, Calidris pugnax (A)
Sharp-tailed sandpiper, Calidris acuminata (A)
Stilt sandpiper, Calidris himantopus
Curlew sandpiper, Calidris ferruginea (A) (Near-threatened)
Sanderling, Calidris alba
Dunlin, Calidris alpina
Purple sandpiper, Calidris maritima (A)
Baird's sandpiper, Calidris bairdii
Little stint, Calidris minuta (A)
Least sandpiper, Calidris minutilla
White-rumped sandpiper, Calidris fuscicollis
Buff-breasted sandpiper, Calidris subruficollis (Near-threatened)
Pectoral sandpiper, Calidris melanotos
Semipalmated sandpiper, Calidris pusilla (Near-threatened)
Western sandpiper, Calidris mauri
Short-billed dowitcher, Limnodromus griseus
Long-billed dowitcher, Limnodromus scolopaceus
American woodcock, Scolopax minor (A)
Wilson's snipe, Gallinago delicata
Terek sandpiper, Xenus cinereus (A)
Spotted sandpiper, Actitis macularia
Solitary sandpiper, Tringa solitaria
Wandering tattler, Tringa incana
Lesser yellowlegs, Tringa flavipes
Willet, Tringa semipalmata
Greater yellowlegs, Tringa melanoleuca
Wood sandpiper, Tringa glareola (A)
Marsh sandpiper, Tringa stagnatilis (A)
Wilson's phalarope, Phalaropus tricolor
Red-necked phalarope, Phalaropus lobatus
Red phalarope, Phalaropus fulicarius

Skuas and jaegers
Order: CharadriiformesFamily: Stercorariidae

The family Stercorariidae are, in general, medium to large birds, typically with gray or brown plumage, often with white markings on the wings. They nest on the ground in temperate and arctic regions and are long-distance migrants.

South polar skua, Stercorarius maccormicki
Pomarine jaeger, Stercorarius pomarinus
Parasitic jaeger, Stercorarius parasiticus
Long-tailed jaeger, Stercorarius longicaudus

Auks, murres, and puffins
Order: CharadriiformesFamily: Alcidae

Alcids are superficially similar to penguins due to their black-and-white colors, their upright posture, and some of their habits. However, they are not related to the penguins and differ in being able to fly. Auks live on the open sea, only deliberately coming ashore to nest.

Common murre, Uria aalge
Pigeon guillemot, Cepphus columba (A)
Marbled murrelet, Brachyramphus marmoratus (A) (Endangered)
Scripps's murrelet, Synthliboramphus scrippsi (Vulnerable)
Guadalupe murrelet, Synthliboramphus hypoleucus (Endangered)
Craveri's murrelet, Synthliboramphus craveri (Breeding endemic) (Vulnerable)
Ancient murrelet, Synthliboramphus antiquus (A)
Cassin's auklet, Ptychoramphus aleuticus (Near-threatened)
Parakeet auklet, Aethia psittacula (A)
Crested auklet, Aethia cristatella (A)
Rhinoceros auklet, Cerorhinca monocerata

Gulls, terns, and skimmers

Order: CharadriiformesFamily: Laridae

Laridae is a family of medium to large seabirds and includes gulls, kittiwakes, terns, and skimmers. They are typically gray or white, often with black markings on the head or wings. They have longish bills and webbed feet. Terns are a group of generally medium to large seabirds typically with gray or white plumage, often with black markings on the head. Most terns hunt fish by diving but some pick insects off the surface of fresh water. Terns are generally long-lived birds, with several species known to live in excess of 30 years. Skimmers are a small family of tropical tern-like birds. They have an elongated lower mandible which they use to feed by flying low over the water surface and skimming the water for small fish.

Black-legged kittiwake, Rissa tridactyla
Sabine's gull, Xema sabini
Bonaparte's gull, Chroicocephalus philadelphia
Black-headed gull, Chroicocephalus ridibundus (A)
Little gull, Hydrocoloeus minutus (A)
Gray gull, Leucophaeus modestus (A)
Laughing gull, Leucophaeus atricilla
Franklin's gull, Leucophaeus pipixcan
Black-tailed gull, Larus crassirostris (A)
Heermann's gull, Larus heermanni (Near-threatened)
Short-billed gull, Larus bracyyrhynchus
Ring-billed gull, Larus delawarensis
Western gull, Larus occidentalis
Yellow-footed gull, Larus livens (Breeding endemic)
California gull, Larus californicus
Herring gull, Larus argentatus
Iceland gull, Larus glaucoides 
Lesser black-backed gull, Larus fuscus (A)
Glaucous-winged gull, Larus glaucescens
Glaucous gull, Larus hyperboreus
Great black-backed gull, Larus marinus (A)
Kelp gull, Larus dominicanus (A)
Brown noddy, Anous stolidus
Black noddy, Anous minutus (A)
White tern, Gygis alba (A)
Sooty tern, Onychoprion fuscata
Bridled tern, Onychoprion anaethetus
Least tern, Sternula antillarum
Gull-billed tern, Gelochelidon nilotica
Caspian tern, Hydroprogne caspia
Black tern, Chlidonias niger
Roseate tern, Sterna dougallii
Common tern, Sterna hirundo
Arctic tern, Sterna paradisaea
Forster's tern, Sterna forsteri
Royal tern, Thalasseus maxima
Sandwich tern, Thalasseus sandvicensis
Elegant tern, Thalasseus elegans (Near-threatened)
Black skimmer, Rynchops niger

Sunbittern
Order: EurypygiformesFamily: Eurypygidae

The sunbittern is a bittern-like bird of tropical regions of the Americas and the sole member of the family Eurypygidae (sometimes spelled Eurypigidae) and genus Eurypyga.

Sunbittern, Eurypyga helias (A)

Tropicbirds

Order: PhaethontiformesFamily: Phaethontidae

Tropicbirds are slender white birds of tropical oceans which have exceptionally long central tail feathers. Their heads and long wings have black markings.

White-tailed tropicbird, Phaethon lepturus (A)
Red-billed tropicbird, Phaethon aethereus
Red-tailed tropicbird, Phaethon rubricauda (A)

Loons

Order: GaviiformesFamily: Gaviidae

Loons, known as divers in Europe, are a group of aquatic birds found in many parts of North America and northern Europe. They are the size of a large duck or small goose, which they somewhat resemble in shape when swimming.

Red-throated loon, Gavia stellata
Arctic loon, Gavia arctica (A)
Pacific loon, Gavia pacifica
Common loon, Gavia immer
Yellow-billed loon, Gavia adamsii (A) (Near-threatened)

Albatrosses
Order: ProcellariiformesFamily: Diomedeidae

The albatrosses are among the largest of flying birds, and the great albatrosses from the genus Diomedea have the largest wingspans of any extant birds.

Laysan albatross, Phoebastria immutabilis (Near-threatened)
Black-footed albatross, Phoebastria nigripes (Near-threatened)
Short-tailed albatross, Phoebastria albatrus (A) (Vulnerable)

Southern storm-petrels
Order: ProcellariiformesFamily: Oceanitidae

The storm-petrels are the smallest seabirds, relatives of the petrels, feeding on planktonic crustaceans and small fish picked from the surface, typically while hovering. The flight is fluttering and sometimes bat-like. Until 2018, this family's three species were included with the other storm-petrels in family Hydrobatidae.

Wilson's storm-petrel, Oceanites oceanicus (A)
White-bellied storm-petrel, Fregetta grallaria (A)
Black-bellied storm-petrel, Fregetta tropica (A)

Northern storm-petrels
Order: ProcellariiformesFamily: Hydrobatidae

Though the members of this family are similar in many respects to the southern storm-petrels, including their general appearance and habits, there are enough genetic differences to warrant their placement in a separate family.

Fork-tailed storm-petrel, Hydrobates furcatus (A)
Leach's storm-petrel, Hydrobates leucorhous (Vulnerable)
Townsend's storm-petrel, Hydrobates socorroensis (E) (Endangered)
Ainley's storm-petrel, Hydrobates cheimomnestes (Vulnerable)
Ashy storm-petrel, Hydrobates homochroa (Endangered)
Band-rumped storm-petrel, Hydrobates castro (A)
Wedge-rumped storm-petrel, Hydrobatesa tethys
Black storm-petrel, Hydrobates melania
Guadalupe storm-petrel, Hydrobates macrodactylus (E) (Critically endangered, possibly extinct)
Least storm-petrel, Hydrobates microsoma

Shearwaters and petrels

Order: ProcellariiformesFamily: Procellariidae

The procellariids are the main group of medium-sized "true petrels", characterized by united nostrils with medium septum and a long outer functional primary.

Northern fulmar, Fulmarus glacialis
Kermadec petrel, Pterodroma neglecta (A)
Herald petrel, Pterodroma heraldica (A)
Murphy's petrel, Pterodroma ultima (A)
Juan Fernandez petrel, Pterodroma externa (Vulnerable)
Galapagos petrel, Pterodroma phaeopygia (A) (Critically endangered)
White-necked petrel, Pterodroma cervicalis (A) (Vulnerable) 
Cook's petrel, Pterodroma cookii (Vulnerable)
Tahiti petrel, Pterodroma rostrata (A) (Near-threatened)
Bulwer's petrel, Bulweria bulwerii (A)
Parkinson's petrel, Procellaria parkinsoni (A) (Vulnerable)
Cory's shearwater, Calonectris diomedea (A)
Wedge-tailed shearwater, Ardenna pacificus
Buller's shearwater, Ardenna bulleri (A) (Vulnerable)
Short-tailed shearwater, Ardenna tenuirostris (A)
Sooty shearwater, Ardenna griseus (Near-threatened)
Great shearwater, Ardenna gravis (A)
Pink-footed shearwater, Ardenna creatopus (Vulnerable)
Flesh-footed shearwater, Ardenna carneipes (A) (Near-threatened)
Christmas shearwater, Puffinus nativitatis (A)
Galapagos shearwater, Puffinus subalaris
Manx shearwater, Puffinus puffinus (A)
Townsend's shearwater, Puffinus auricularis (Breeding endemic) (Critically endangered)
Black-vented shearwater, Puffinus opisthomelas (Breeding endemic) (Near-threatened)
Audubon's shearwater, Puffinus lherminieri (A)

Storks
Order: CiconiiformesFamily: Ciconiidae

Storks are large, long-legged, long-necked wading birds with long, stout bills. Storks are mute, but bill-clattering is an important mode of communication at the nest. Their nests can be large and may be reused for many years. Many species are migratory.

Jabiru, Jabiru mycteria
Wood stork, Mycteria americana

Frigatebirds
Order: SuliformesFamily: Fregatidae

Frigatebirds are large seabirds usually found over tropical oceans. They are large, black-and-white or completely black, with long wings and deeply forked tails. The males have colored inflatable throat pouches. They do not swim or walk and cannot take off from a flat surface. Having the largest wingspan-to-body-weight ratio of any bird, they are essentially aerial, able to stay aloft for more than a week.

Lesser frigatebird, Fregata ariel (A)
Magnificent frigatebird, Fregata magnificens
Great frigatebird, Fregata minor

Boobies and gannets

Order: SuliformesFamily: Sulidae

The sulids comprise the gannets and boobies. Both groups are medium to large coastal seabirds that plunge-dive for fish.

Masked booby, Sula dactylatra
Nazca booby, Sula granti
Blue-footed booby, Sula nebouxii
Brown booby, Sula leucogaster
Red-footed booby, Sula sula
Northern gannet, Morus bassanus

Anhingas
Order: SuliformesFamily: Anhingidae

Anhingas are often called "snake-birds" because of their long thin neck, which gives a snake-like appearance when they swim with their bodies submerged. The males have black and dark-brown plumage, an erectile crest on the nape, and a larger bill than the female. The females have much paler plumage especially on the neck and underparts. The anhingas have completely webbed feet and their legs are short and set far back on the body. Their plumage is somewhat permeable, like that of cormorants, and they spread their wings to dry after diving.

Anhinga, Anhinga anhinga

Cormorants and shags
Order: SuliformesFamily: Phalacrocoracidae

Phalacrocoracidae is a family of medium to large coastal, fish-eating seabirds that includes cormorants and shags. Plumage coloration varies, with the majority having mainly dark plumage, some species being black-and-white, and a few being colorful.

Brandt's cormorant, Urile penicillatus
Pelagic cormorant, Urile pelagicus
Double-crested cormorant, Nannopterum auritum
Neotropic cormorant, Nannopterum brasilianum

Pelicans
Order: PelecaniformesFamily: Pelecanidae

Pelicans are large water birds with a distinctive pouch under their beak. As with other members of the order Pelecaniformes, they have webbed feet with four toes.

American white pelican, Pelecanus erythrorhynchos
Brown pelican, Pelecanus occidentalis

Herons, egrets, and bitterns

Order: PelecaniformesFamily: Ardeidae

The family Ardeidae contains the bitterns, herons, and egrets. Herons and egrets are medium to large wading birds with long necks and legs. Bitterns tend to be shorter necked and more wary. Members of Ardeidae fly with their necks retracted, unlike other long-necked birds such as storks, ibises and spoonbills.

Pinnated bittern, Botaurus pinnatus
American bittern, Botaurus lentiginosus
Least bittern, Ixobrychus exilis
Bare-throated tiger-heron, Tigrisoma mexicanum
Great blue heron, Ardea herodias
Great egret, Ardea alba
Snowy egret, Egretta thula
Little blue heron, Egretta caerulea
Tricolored heron, Egretta tricolor
Reddish egret, Egretta rufescens (Near-threatened)
Cattle egret, Bubulcus ibis
Green heron, Butorides virescens
Agami heron, Agamia agami (Vulnerable)
Black-crowned night-heron, Nycticorax nycticorax
Yellow-crowned night-heron, Nyctanassa violacea
Boat-billed heron, Cochlearius cochlearius

Ibises and spoonbills

Order: PelecaniformesFamily: Threskiornithidae

Threskiornithidae is a family of large terrestrial and wading birds which includes the ibises and spoonbills. They have long, broad wings with 11 primary and about 20 secondary feathers. They are strong fliers and despite their size and weight, very capable soarers.

White ibis, Eudocimus albus
Glossy ibis, Plegadis falcinellus
White-faced ibis, Plegadis chihi
Roseate spoonbill, Platalea ajaja

New World vultures
Order: CathartiformesFamily: Cathartidae

The New World vultures are not closely related to Old World vultures, but superficially resemble them because of convergent evolution. Like the Old World vultures, they are scavengers. However, unlike Old World vultures, which find carcasses by sight, New World vultures have a good sense of smell with which they locate carrion.

California condor, Gymnogyps californianus (Critically endangered) reintroduced
King vulture, Sarcoramphus papa
Black vulture, Coragyps atratus
Turkey vulture, Cathartes aura
Lesser yellow-headed vulture, Cathartes burrovianus

Osprey
Order: AccipitriformesFamily: Pandionidae

The family Pandionidae contains only one species, the osprey. The osprey is a medium-large raptor which is a specialist fish-eater with a worldwide distribution.

Osprey, Pandion haliaetus

Hawks, eagles, and kites

Order: AccipitriformesFamily: Accipitridae

Accipitridae is a family of birds of prey, which includes hawks, eagles, kites, harriers, and Old World vultures. These birds have powerful hooked beaks for tearing flesh from their prey, strong legs, powerful talons, and keen eyesight.

White-tailed kite, Elanus leucurus
Hook-billed kite, Chondrohierax uncinatus
Gray-headed kite, Leptodon cayanensis
Swallow-tailed kite, Elanoides forficatus
Crested eagle, Morphnus guianensis (Near-threatened)
Harpy eagle, Harpia harpyja (Near-threatened)
Golden eagle, Aquila chrysaetos
Black hawk-eagle, Spizaetus tyrannus
Black-and-white hawk-eagle, Spizaetus melanoleucus
Ornate hawk-eagle, Spizaetus ornatus (Near-threatened)
Double-toothed kite, Harpagus bidentatus
Northern harrier, Circus hudsonius
Sharp-shinned hawk, Accipiter striatus
Cooper's hawk, Accipiter cooperii
Bicolored hawk, Accipiter bicolor
Northern goshawk, Accipiter gentilis
Bald eagle, Haliaeetus leucocephalus
Mississippi kite, Ictinia mississippiensis
Plumbeous kite, Ictinia plumbea
Black-collared hawk, Busarellus nigricollis
Crane hawk, Geranospiza caerulescens
Snail kite, Rostrhamus sociabilis
Common black hawk, Buteogallus anthracinus
Great black hawk, Buteogallus urubitinga
Solitary eagle, Buteogallus solitarius (Near-threatened)
Roadside hawk, Rupornis magnirostris
Harris's hawk, Parabuteo unicinctus
White-tailed hawk, Geranoaetus albicaudatus
White hawk, Pseudastur albicollis
Gray hawk, Buteo plagiatus
Red-shouldered hawk, Buteo lineatus
Broad-winged hawk, Buteo platypterus
Short-tailed hawk, Buteo brachyurus
Swainson's hawk, Buteo swainsoni
Zone-tailed hawk, Buteo albonotatus
Red-tailed hawk, Buteo jamaicensis
Rough-legged hawk, Buteo lagopus
Ferruginous hawk, Buteo regalis

Barn-owls
Order: StrigiformesFamily: Tytonidae

Barn-owls are medium to large owls with large heads and characteristic heart-shaped faces. They have long strong legs with powerful talons.

Barn owl, Tyto alba

Owls

Order: StrigiformesFamily: Strigidae

The typical owls are small to large solitary nocturnal birds of prey. They have large forward-facing eyes and ears, a hawk-like beak, and a conspicuous circle of feathers around each eye called a facial disk.

Flammulated owl, Psiloscops flammeolus
Whiskered screech-owl, Megascops trichopsis
Bearded screech-owl, Megascops barbarus (Vulnerable)
Pacific screech-owl, Megascops cooperi
Western screech-owl, Megascops kennicottii
Eastern screech-owl, Megascops asio
Balsas screech-owl, Megascops seductus (E)
Middle American screech owl, Megascops guatemalae
Crested owl, Lophostrix cristata
Spectacled owl, Pulsatrix perspicillata
Great horned owl, Bubo virginianus
Northern pygmy-owl, Glaucidium gnoma
Central American pygmy-owl, Glaucidium griseiceps
Tamaulipas pygmy-owl, Glaucidium sanchezi (E) (Near-threatened)
Colima pygmy-owl, Glaucidium palmarum (E)
Ferruginous pygmy-owl, Glaucidium brasilianum
Elf owl, Micrathene whitneyi
Burrowing owl, Athene cunicularia
Mottled owl, Strix virgata
Black-and-white owl, Strix nigrolineata
Spotted owl, Strix occidentalis (Near-threatened)
Cinereous owl, Strix sartorii
Fulvous owl, Strix fulvescens
Long-eared owl, Asio otus
Stygian owl, Asio stygius
Short-eared owl, Asio flammeus
Striped owl, Asio clamator
Northern saw-whet owl, Aegolius acadicus
Unspotted saw-whet owl, Aegolius ridgwayi

Trogons
Order: TrogoniformesFamily: Trogonidae

The family Trogonidae includes trogons and quetzals. Found in tropical woodlands worldwide, they feed on insects and fruit, and their broad bills and weak legs reflect their diet and arboreal habits. Although their flight is fast, they are reluctant to fly any distance. Trogons have soft, often colorful, feathers with distinctive male and female plumage.

Slaty-tailed trogon, Trogon massena
Black-headed trogon, Trogon melanocephalus
Citreoline trogon, Trogon citreolus (E)
Gartered trogon, Trogon caligatus
Elegant trogon, Trogon elegans
Mountain trogon, Trogon mexicanus
Collared trogon, Trogon collaris
Eared quetzal, Euptilotis neoxenus (E) (Near-threatened)
Resplendent quetzal, Pharomachrus mocinno (Near-threatened)

Motmots
Order: CoraciiformesFamily: Momotidae

The motmots have colorful plumage and long, graduated tails which they display by waggling back and forth. In most of the species, the barbs near the ends of the two longest (central) tail feathers are weak and fall off, leaving a length of bare shaft and creating a racket-shaped tail.

Tody motmot, Hylomanes momotula
Blue-throated motmot, Aspatha gularis
Russet-crowned motmot, Momotus mexicanus
Blue-capped motmot, Momotus coeruliceps (E)
Lesson's motmot, Momotus lessonii
Keel-billed motmot, Electron carinatum (A) (Vulnerable)
Turquoise-browed motmot, Eumomota superciliosa

Kingfishers
Order: CoraciiformesFamily: Alcedinidae

Kingfishers are medium-sized birds with large heads, long, pointed bills, short legs, and stubby tails.

Belted kingfisher, Megaceryle alcyon
Ringed kingfisher, Megaceryle torquatus
Amazon kingfisher, Chloroceryle amazona
American pygmy kingfisher, Chloroceryle aenea
Green kingfisher, Chloroceryle americana

Puffbirds
Order: PiciformesFamily: Bucconidae

The puffbirds are related to the jacamars and have the same range, but lack the iridescent colors of that family. They are mainly brown, rufous, or gray, with large heads and flattened bills with hooked tips. The loose abundant plumage and short tails makes them look stout and puffy, giving rise to the English common name of the family.

White-necked puffbird, Notharchus hyperrhynchus
White-whiskered puffbird, Malacoptila panamensis

Jacamars
Order: PiciformesFamily: Galbulidae

The jacamars are near passerine birds from tropical South America, with a range that extends up to Mexico. They feed on insects caught on the wing, and are glossy, elegant birds with long bills and tails. In appearance and behavior they resemble the Old World bee-eaters, although they are more closely related to puffbirds.

Rufous-tailed jacamar, Galbula ruficauda

Toucans

Order: PiciformesFamily: Ramphastidae

Toucans are near passerine birds from the Neotropics. They are brightly marked and have enormous, colorful bills which in some species amount to half their body length.

Northern emerald-toucanet, Aulacorhynchus prasinus
Collared aracari, Pteroglossus torquatus
Keel-billed toucan, Ramphastos sulfuratus

Woodpeckers

Order: PiciformesFamily: Picidae

Woodpeckers are small to medium-sized birds with chisel-like beaks, short legs, stiff tails, and long tongues used for capturing insects. Some species have feet with two toes pointing forward and two backward, while several species have only three toes. Many woodpeckers have the habit of tapping noisily on tree trunks with their beaks.

Lewis's woodpecker, Melanerpes lewis
Acorn woodpecker, Melanerpes formicivorus
Black-cheeked woodpecker, Melanerpes pucherani
Golden-cheeked woodpecker, Melanerpes chrysogenys (E)
Gray-breasted woodpecker, Melanerpes hypopolius (E)
Yucatan woodpecker, Melanerpes pygmaeus
Gila woodpecker, Melanerpes uropygialis
Golden-fronted woodpecker, Melanerpes aurifrons
Williamson's sapsucker, Sphyrapicus thyroideus
Yellow-bellied sapsucker, Sphyrapicus varius
Red-naped sapsucker, Sphyrapicus nuchalis
Red-breasted sapsucker, Sphyrapicus ruber
Downy woodpecker, Dryobates pubescens
Nuttall's woodpecker, Dryobates nuttallii
Ladder-backed woodpecker, Dryobates scalaris
Hairy woodpecker, Dryobates villosus
Smoky-brown woodpecker, Dryobates fumigatus
Arizona woodpecker, Dryobates arizonae
Strickland's woodpecker, Dryobates stricklandi (E)
Golden-olive woodpecker, Colaptes rubiginosus
Gray-crowned woodpecker, Colaptes auricularis (E)
Northern flicker, Colaptes auratus
Gilded flicker, Colaptes chrysoides
Chestnut-colored woodpecker, Celeus castaneus
Lineated woodpecker, Dryocopus lineatus
Pale-billed woodpecker, Campephilus guatemalensis
Imperial woodpecker, Campephilus imperialis (E) (Critically endangered, possibly extinct)

Falcons and caracaras

Order: FalconiformesFamily: Falconidae

Falconidae is a family of diurnal birds of prey. They differ from hawks, eagles, and kites in that they kill with their beaks instead of their talons.

Laughing falcon, Herpetotheres cachinnans
Barred forest-falcon, Micrastur ruficollis
Collared forest-falcon, Micrastur semitorquatus
Red-throated caracara, Ibycter americanus (A)
Crested caracara, Caracara plancus
Guadalupe caracara, Caracara lutosa (E) (Extinct)
American kestrel, Falco sparverius
Merlin, Falco columbarius
Aplomado falcon, Falco femoralis
Bat falcon, Falco rufigularis
Orange-breasted falcon, Falco deiroleucus (Near-threatened)
Peregrine falcon, Falco peregrinus
Prairie falcon, Falco mexicanus

New World and African parrots
Order: PsittaciformesFamily: Psittacidae

Parrots are small to large birds with a characteristic curved beak. Their upper mandibles have slight mobility in the joint with the skull and they have a generally erect stance. All parrots are zygodactyl, having the four toes on each foot placed two at the front and two to the back.

Monk parakeet, Myiopsitta monachus (I)
Olive-throated parakeet, Eupsittula nana
Orange-fronted parakeet, Eupsittula canicularis
Scarlet macaw, Ara macao
Military macaw, Ara militaris (Vulnerable)
Green parakeet, Psittacara holochlorus
Socorro parakeet, Psittacara brevipes (E)
Pacific parakeet, Psittacara strenuus
Thick-billed parrot, Rhynchopsitta pachyrhyncha (E) (Endangered)
Maroon-fronted parrot, Rhynchopsitta terrisi (E) (Endangered)
Barred parakeet, Bolborhynchus lineola
Mexican parrotlet, Forpus cyanopygius (E) (Near-threatened)
Orange-chinned parakeet, Brotogeris jugularis
Brown-hooded parrot, Pionopsitta haematotis
White-crowned parrot, Pionus senilis
White-fronted parrot, Amazona albifrons
Yellow-lored parrot, Amazona xantholora
Red-crowned parrot, Amazona viridigenalis (E) (Endangered)
Lilac-crowned parrot, Amazona finschi (E) (Endangered)
Red-lored parrot, Amazona autumnalis
Mealy parrot, Amazona farinosa
Yellow-headed parrot, Amazona oratrix (Endangered)
Yellow-naped parrot, Amazona auropalliata (Vulnerable)

Manakins
Order: PasseriformesFamily: Pipridae

The manakins are a family of subtropical and tropical mainland Central and South America, and Trinidad and Tobago. They are compact forest birds, the males typically being brightly colored, although the females of most species are duller and usually green-plumaged. Manakins feed on small fruits, berries and insects.

Long-tailed manakin, Chiroxiphia linearis
White-collared manakin, Manacus candei
Red-capped manakin, Ceratopipra mentalis

Cotingas
Order: PasseriformesFamily: Cotingidae

The cotingas are birds of forests or forest edges in tropical South America. Comparatively little is known about this diverse group, although all have broad bills with hooked tips, rounded wings, and strong legs. The males of many of the species are brightly colored or decorated with plumes or wattles.

Lovely cotinga, Cotinga amabilis
Rufous piha, Lipaugus unirufus

Tityras and allies
Order: PasseriformesFamily: Tityridae

Tityridae is family of suboscine passerine birds found in forest and woodland in the Neotropics. The approximately 30 species in this family were formerly lumped with the families Pipridae and Cotingidae (see Taxonomy).

Northern schiffornis, Schiffornis veraepacis
Speckled mourner, Laniocera rufescens
Masked tityra, Tityra semifasciata
Black-crowned tityra, Tityra inquisitor
Cinnamon becard, Pachyramphus cinnamomeus
White-winged becard, Pachyramphus polychopterus (A)
Gray-collared becard, Pachyramphus major
Rose-throated becard, Pachyramphus aglaiae

Royal flycatcher and allies
Order: PasseriformesFamily: Onychorhynchidae

The members of this small family, created in 2018, were formerly considered to be tyrant flycatchers, family Tyrannidae.

Royal flycatcher, Onychorhynchus mexicanus
Ruddy-tailed flycatcher, Terenotriccus erythrurus
Sulphur-rumped flycatcher, Myiobius sulphureipygius

Tyrant flycatchers

Order: PasseriformesFamily: Tyrannidae

Tyrant flycatchers are passerine birds which occur throughout North and South America. They superficially resemble the Old World flycatchers, but are more robust and have stronger bills. They do not have the sophisticated vocal capabilities of the songbirds. Most, but not all, have plain coloring. As the name implies, most are insectivorous.

Stub-tailed spadebill, Platyrinchus cancrominus
Ochre-bellied flycatcher, Mionectes oleagineus
Sepia-capped flycatcher, Leptopogon amaurocephalus
Northern bentbill, Oncostoma cinereigulare
Slate-headed tody-flycatcher, Poecilotriccus sylvia
Common tody-flycatcher, Todirostrum cinereum
Eye-ringed flatbill, Rhynchocyclus brevirostris
Yellow-olive flycatcher, Tolmomyias sulphurescens
Yellow-bellied tyrannulet, Ornithion semiflavum
Northern beardless-tyrannulet, Camptostoma imberbe
Greenish elaenia, Myiopagis viridicata
Caribbean elaenia, Elaenia martinica
Yellow-bellied elaenia, Elaenia flavogaster
Mountain elaenia, Elaenia frantzii
Guatemalan tyrannulet, Zimmerius vilissimus
Bright-rumped attila, Attila spadiceus
Rufous mourner, Rhytipterna holerythra
Yucatan flycatcher, Myiarchus yucatanensis
Dusky-capped flycatcher, Myiarchus tuberculifer
Ash-throated flycatcher, Myiarchus cinerascens
Nutting's flycatcher, Myiarchus nuttingi
Great crested flycatcher, Myiarchus crinitus
Brown-crested flycatcher, Myiarchus tyrannulus
Flammulated flycatcher, Ramphotrigon flammulatus (E)
Great kiskadee, Pitangus sulphuratus
Boat-billed flycatcher, Megarynchus pitangua
Social flycatcher, Myiozetetes similis
Streaked flycatcher, Myiodynastes maculatus
Sulphur-bellied flycatcher, Myiodynastes luteiventris
Piratic flycatcher, Legatus leucophaius
Tropical kingbird, Tyrannus melancholicus
Couch's kingbird, Tyrannus couchii
Cassin's kingbird, Tyrannus vociferans
Thick-billed kingbird, Tyrannus crassirostris
Western kingbird, Tyrannus verticalis
Eastern kingbird, Tyrannus tyrannus
Gray kingbird, Tyrannus dominicensis (A)
Scissor-tailed flycatcher, Tyrannus forficatus
Fork-tailed flycatcher, Tyrannus savana
Belted flycatcher, Xenotriccus callizonus (E)
Pileated flycatcher, Xenotriccus mexicanus (E)
Tufted flycatcher, Mitrephanes phaeocercus
Olive-sided flycatcher, Contopus cooperi (Near-threatened)
Greater pewee, Contopus pertinax
Western wood-pewee, Contopus sordidulus
Eastern wood-pewee, Contopus virens
Tropical pewee, Contopus cinereus
Yellow-bellied flycatcher, Empidonax flaviventris
Acadian flycatcher, Empidonax virescens
Alder flycatcher, Empidonax alnorum
Willow flycatcher, Empidonax traillii
White-throated flycatcher, Empidonax albigularis
Least flycatcher, Empidonax minimus
Hammond's flycatcher, Empidonax hammondii
Gray flycatcher, Empidonax wrightii
Dusky flycatcher, Empidonax oberholseri
Pine flycatcher, Empidonax affinis
Pacific-slope flycatcher, Empidonax difficilis
Cordilleran flycatcher, Empidonax occidentalis
Yellowish flycatcher, Empidonax flavescens
Buff-breasted flycatcher, Empidonax fulvifrons
Black phoebe, Sayornis nigricans
Eastern phoebe, Sayornis phoebe
Say's phoebe, Sayornis saya
Vermilion flycatcher, Pyrocephalus rubinus

Typical antbirds
Order: PasseriformesFamily: Thamnophilidae

The antbirds are a large family of small passerine birds of subtropical and tropical Central and South America. They are forest birds which tend to feed on insects at or near the ground. A sizable minority of them specialize in following columns of army ants to eat small invertebrates that leave their hiding places to flee from the ants. Many species lack bright color, with brown, black, and white being the dominant tones.

Great antshrike, Taraba major
Barred antshrike, Thamnophilus doliatus
Russet antshrike, Thamnistes anabatinus
Plain antvireo, Dysithamnus mentalis
Slaty antwren, Myrmotherula schisticolor (A)
Dot-winged antwren, Microrhopias quixensis
Dusky antbird, Cercomacroides tyrannina
Bare-crowned antbird, Gymnocichla nudiceps (A)

Antpittas
Order: PasseriformesFamily: Grallariidae

Antpittas resemble the true pittas with strong, longish legs, very short tails, and stout bills.

Scaled antpitta, Grallaria guatimalensis

Antthrushes
Order: PasseriformesFamily: Formicariidae

Antthrushes resemble small rails with strong, longish legs, very short tails, and stout bills.

Mayan antthrush, Formicarius moniliger
Black-faced antthrush, Formicarius analis

Ovenbirds and woodcreepers
Order: PasseriformesFamily: Furnariidae

Ovenbirds comprise a large family of small sub-oscine passerine bird species found in Central and South America. They are a diverse group of insectivores which gets its name from the elaborate "oven-like" clay nests built by some species, although others build stick nests or nest in tunnels or clefts in rock. The woodcreepers are brownish birds which maintain an upright vertical posture, supported by their stiff tail vanes. They feed mainly on insects taken from tree trunks.

Middle American leaftosser, Sclerurus mexicanus
Scaly-throated leaftosser, Sclerurus guatemalensis
Olivaceous woodcreeper, Sittasomus griseicapillus
Ruddy woodcreeper, Dendrocincla homochroa
Tawny-winged woodcreeper, Dendrocincla anabatina
Wedge-billed woodcreeper, Glyphorynchus spirurus
Northern barred-woodcreeper, Dendrocolaptes sanctithomae
Black-banded woodcreeper, Dendrocolaptes picumnus (A)
Strong-billed woodcreeper, Xiphocolaptes promeropirhynchus
Ivory-billed woodcreeper, Xiphorhynchus flavigaster
Spotted woodcreeper, Xiphorhynchus erythropygius
Streak-headed woodcreeper, Lepidocolaptes souleyetii
White-striped woodcreeper, Lepidocolaptes leucogaster (E)
Spot-crowned woodcreeper, Lepidocolaptes affinis
Plain xenops, Xenops minutus
Scaly-throated foliage-gleaner, Anabacerthia variegaticeps
Ruddy foliage-gleaner, Clibanornis rubiginosus
Buff-throated foliage-gleaner, Automolus ochrolaemus
Rufous-breasted spinetail, Synallaxis erythrothorax

Vireos, shrike-babblers, and erpornis
Order: PasseriformesFamily: Vireonidae

The vireos are a group of small to medium-sized passerine birds mostly restricted to the New World, though a few other species in the family are found in Asia . They are typically greenish in color and resemble wood-warblers apart from their heavier bills.

Rufous-browed peppershrike, Cyclarhis gujanensis
Chestnut-sided shrike-vireo, Vireolanius melitophrys
Green shrike-vireo, Vireolanius pulchellus
Tawny-crowned greenlet, Tunchiornis ochraceiceps
Lesser greenlet, Pachysylvia decurtata
Golden vireo, Vireo hypochryseus (E)
Slaty vireo, Vireo brevipennis (E)
Black-capped vireo, Vireo atricapilla (Near-threatened)
Dwarf vireo, Vireo nelsoni (E)
White-eyed vireo, Vireo griseus
Mangrove vireo, Vireo pallens
Cozumel vireo, Vireo bairdi (E)
Bell's vireo, Vireo bellii (Near-threatened)
Gray vireo, Vireo vicinior
Hutton's vireo, Vireo huttoni
Yellow-throated vireo, Vireo flavifrons
Cassin's vireo, Vireo cassinii
Blue-headed vireo, Vireo solitarius
Plumbeous vireo, Vireo plumbeus
Philadelphia vireo, Vireo philadelphicus
Warbling vireo, Vireo gilvus
Brown-capped vireo, Vireo leucophrys
Red-eyed vireo, Vireo olivaceus
Yellow-green vireo, Vireo flavoviridis
Black-whiskered vireo, Vireo altiloquus (A)
Yucatan vireo, Vireo magister

Shrikes
Order: PasseriformesFamily: Laniidae

Shrikes are passerine birds known for their habit of catching other birds and small animals and impaling the uneaten portions of their bodies on thorns. A shrike's beak is hooked, like that of a typical bird of prey.

Loggerhead shrike, Lanius ludovicianus

Crows, jays, and magpies
Order: PasseriformesFamily: Corvidae

The family Corvidae includes crows, ravens, jays, choughs, magpies, treepies, nutcrackers, and ground jays. Corvids are above average in size among the Passeriformes, and some of the larger species show high levels of intelligence.

White-throated jay, Cyanolyca mirabilis (E) (Vulnerable)
Dwarf jay, Cyanolyca nanus (E) (Near-threatened)
Black-throated jay, Cyanolyca pumilo
Azure-hooded jay, Cyanolyca cucullata
Black-throated magpie-jay, Calocitta colliei (E)
White-throated magpie-jay, Calocitta formosa
Brown jay, Psilorhinus morio
Tufted jay, Cyanocorax dickeyi (E) (Near-threatened)
Green jay, Cyanocorax yncas
San Blas jay, Cyanocorax sanblasianus (E)
Yucatan jay, Cyanocorax yucatanicus
Purplish-backed jay, Cyanocorax beecheii (E)
Pinyon jay, Gymnorhinus cyanocephalus (Vulnerable)
Steller's jay, Cyanocitta stelleri
California scrub-jay, Aphelocoma californica
Woodhouse's scrub-jay, Aphelocoma woodhouseii
Transvolcanic jay, Aphelocoma ultramarina (E)
Mexican jay, Aphelocoma wollweberi
Unicolored jay, Aphelocoma unicolor
Clark's nutcracker, Nucifraga columbiana
American crow, Corvus brachyrhynchos
Tamaulipas crow, Corvus imparatus (E)
Sinaloa crow, Corvus sinaloae (E)
Chihuahuan raven, Corvus cryptoleucus
Common raven, Corvus corax

Penduline-tits
Order: PasseriformesFamily: Remizidae

The penduline-tits are a group of small passerine birds related to the true tits. They are insectivores.

Verdin, Auriparus flaviceps

Tits, chickadees, and titmice

Order: PasseriformesFamily: Paridae

The Paridae are mainly small stocky woodland species with short stout bills. Some have crests. They are adaptable birds, with a mixed diet including seeds and insects.

Mountain chickadee, Poecile gambeli
Mexican chickadee, Poecile sclateri
Bridled titmouse, Baeolophus wollweberi
Oak titmouse, Baeolophus inornatus
Juniper titmouse, Baeolophus ridgwayi (A)
Black-crested titmouse, Baeolophus atricristatus

Larks
Order: PasseriformesFamily: Alaudidae

Larks are small terrestrial birds with often extravagant songs and display flights. Most larks are fairly dull in appearance. Their food is insects and seeds.

Horned lark, Eremophila alpestris

Swallows
Order: PasseriformesFamily: Hirundinidae

The family Hirundinidae is adapted to aerial feeding. They have a slender streamlined body, long pointed wings, and a short bill with a wide gape. The feet are adapted to perching rather than walking, and the front toes are partially joined at the base.

Bank swallow, Riparia riparia
Tree swallow, Tachycineta bicolor
Violet-green swallow, Tachycineta thalassina
Mangrove swallow, Tachycineta albilinea
Black-capped swallow, Notiochelidon pileata
Blue-and-white swallow, Notiochelidon cyanoleuca (A)
Northern rough-winged swallow, Stelgidopteryx serripennis
Brown-chested martin, Progne tapera (A)
Purple martin, Progne subis
Gray-breasted martin, Progne chalybea
Sinaloa martin, Progne sinaloae (Breeding endemic) (Vulnerable)
Barn swallow, Hirundo rustica
Cliff swallow, Petrochelidon pyrrhonota
Cave swallow, Petrochelidon fulva

Long-tailed tits
Order: PasseriformesFamily: Aegithalidae

Long-tailed tits are a group of small passerine birds with medium to long tails. They make woven bag nests in trees. Most eat a mixed diet which includes insects.

Bushtit, Psaltriparus minimus

Leaf warblers
Order: PasseriformesFamily: Phylloscopidae

Leaf warblers are a family of small insectivorous birds found mostly in Eurasia and ranging into Wallacea and Africa. The Arctic warbler breeds east into Alaska. The species are of various sizes, often green-plumaged above and yellow below, or more subdued with grayish-green to grayish-brown colors.

Dusky warbler, Phylloscopus fuscatus (A)
Yellow-browed warbler, Phylloscopus inornatus (A)
Arctic warbler, Phylloscopus borealis (A)

Sylviid warblers, parrotbills, and allies
Order: PasseriformesFamily: Sylviidae

The family Sylviidae is a group of small insectivorous passerine birds. As one common name, "Old World warblers", implies, they mainly occur as breeding species in Europe, Asia and, to a lesser extent, Africa. Most are of generally undistinguished appearance, but many have distinctive songs.

Wrentit, Chamaea fasciata

White-eyes, yuhinas, and allies
Order: PasseriformesFamily: Zosteropidae

The white-eyes are small and mostly undistinguished, their plumage above being generally some dull colour like greenish-olive, but some species have a white or bright yellow throat, breast or lower parts, and several have buff flanks. As their name suggests, many species have a white ring around each eye.

Swinhoe's white-eye, Zosterops simplex (A)

Kinglets
Order: PasseriformesFamily: Regulidae

The kinglets, also called crests, are a small group of birds often included in the Old World warblers, but frequently given family status because they also resemble the titmice.

Ruby-crowned kinglet, Corthylio calendula
Golden-crowned kinglet, Regulus satrapa

Waxwings
Order: PasseriformesFamily: Bombycillidae

The waxwings are a group of birds with soft silky plumage and unique red tips to some of the wing feathers. In the Bohemian and cedar waxwings, these tips look like sealing wax and give the group its name. These are arboreal birds of northern forests. They live on insects in summer and berries in winter.

Cedar waxwing, Bombycilla cedrorum

Silky-flycatchers
Order: PasseriformesFamily: Ptiliogonatidae

The silky-flycatchers are a small family of passerine birds which occur mainly in Central America. They are related to waxwings, and like that group have soft silky plumage, usually gray or pale yellow in color. They have small crests.

Gray silky-flycatcher, Ptiliogonys cinereus
Phainopepla, Phainopepla nitens

Nuthatches
Order: PasseriformesFamily: Sittidae

Nuthatches are small woodland birds. They have the unusual ability to climb down trees head first, unlike other birds which can only go upwards. Nuthatches have big heads, short tails, and powerful bills and feet.

Red-breasted nuthatch, Sitta canadensis
White-breasted nuthatch, Sitta carolinensis
Pygmy nuthatch, Sitta pygmaea

Treecreepers
Order: PasseriformesFamily: Certhiidae

Treecreepers are small woodland birds, brown above and white below. They have thin pointed down-curved bills, which they use to extricate insects from bark. They have stiff tail feathers, like woodpeckers, which they use to support themselves on vertical trees.

Brown creeper, Certhia americana

Gnatcatchers
Order: PasseriformesFamily: Polioptilidae

These dainty birds resemble Old World warblers in their build and habits, moving restlessly through the foliage seeking insects. The gnatcatchers and gnatwrens are mainly soft bluish gray in color and have the typical insectivore's long sharp bill. They are birds of fairly open woodland or scrub which nest in bushes or trees.

Long-billed gnatwren, Ramphocaenus melanurus
Yucatan gnatcatcher, Polioptila albiventris (E)
White-browed gnatcatcher, Polioptila bilineata
Blue-gray gnatcatcher, Polioptila caerulea
Black-tailed gnatcatcher, Polioptila melanura
California gnatcatcher, Polioptila californica
Black-capped gnatcatcher, Polioptila nigriceps
White-lored gnatcatcher, Polioptila albiloris

Wrens
Order: PasseriformesFamily: Troglodytidae

The wrens are mainly small and inconspicuous except for their loud songs. These birds have short wings and thin down-turned bills. Several species often hold their tails upright. All are insectivorous.

Rock wren, Salpinctes obsoletus
Nightingale wren, Microcerculus philomela
Canyon wren, Catherpes mexicanus
Sumichrast's wren, Hylorchilus sumichrasti (E) (Near-threatened)
Nava's wren, Hylorchilus navai (E) (Vulnerable)
House wren, Troglodytes aedon
Socorro wren, Troglodytes sissonii (E) (Near-threatened)
Clarion wren, Troglodytes tanneri (E) (Vulnerable)
Rufous-browed wren, Troglodytes rufociliatus
Pacific wren, Troglodytes pacificus (A)
Winter wren, Troglodytes hiemalis (A)
Sedge wren, Cistothorus platensis
Grass wren, Cistothorus platensis
Marsh wren, Cistothorus palustris
Carolina wren, Thryothorus ludovicianus
Bewick's wren, Thryomanes bewickii
Band-backed wren, Campylorhynchus zonatus
Gray-barred wren, Campylorhynchus megalopterus (E)
Giant wren, Campylorhynchus chiapensis (E)
Rufous-naped wren, Campylorhynchus rufinucha
Spotted wren, Campylorhynchus gularis (E)
Boucard's wren, Campylorhynchus jocosus (E)
Yucatan wren, Campylorhynchus yucatanicus (E) (Near-threatened)
Cactus wren, Campylorhynchus brunneicapillus
Spot-breasted wren, Pheugopedius maculipectus
Happy wren, Pheugopedius felix (E)
Rufous-and-white wren, Thryophilus rufalbus
Sinaloa wren, Thryophilus sinaloa (E)
Banded wren, Thryophilus pleurostictus
Cabanis's wren, Cantorchilus modestus
White-bellied wren, Uropsila leucogastra
White-breasted wood-wren, Henicorhina leucosticta
Gray-breasted wood-wren, Henicorhina leucophrys

Mockingbirds and thrashers

Order: PasseriformesFamily: Mimidae

The mimids are a family of passerine birds that includes thrashers, mockingbirds, tremblers, and the New World catbirds. These birds are notable for their vocalizations, especially their ability to mimic a wide variety of birds and other sounds heard outdoors. Their coloring tends towards dull grays and browns. Mexico has the greatest diversity of this family of any country.

Blue mockingbird, Melanotis caerulescens (E)
Blue-and-white mockingbird, Melanotis hypoleucus
Black catbird, Melanoptila glabrirostris (Near-threatened)
Gray catbird, Dumetella carolinensis
Curve-billed thrasher, Toxostoma curvirostre
Ocellated thrasher, Toxostoma ocellatum (E)
Brown thrasher, Toxostoma rufum (A)
Long-billed thrasher, Toxostoma longirostre
Cozumel thrasher, Toxostoma guttatum (E) (Critically endangered)
Bendire's thrasher, Toxostoma bendirei (Vulnerable)
Gray thrasher, Toxostoma cinereum (E)
California thrasher, Toxostoma redivivum
LeConte's thrasher, Toxostoma lecontei
Crissal thrasher, Toxostoma crissale
Sage thrasher, Oreoscoptes montanus
Socorro mockingbird, Mimus graysoni (E) (Critically endangered)
Tropical mockingbird, Mimus gilvus
Northern mockingbird, Mimus polyglottos

Starlings
Order: PasseriformesFamily: Sturnidae

Starlings are small to medium-sized passerine birds. Their flight is strong and direct and they are very gregarious. Their preferred habitat is fairly open country. They eat insects and fruit. Plumage is typically dark with a metallic sheen.

European starling, Sturnus vulgaris (I)

Dippers
Order: PasseriformesFamily: Cinclidae

Dippers are a group of perching birds whose habitat includes aquatic environments in the Americas, Europe, and Asia. They are named for their bobbing or dipping movements.

American dipper, Cinclus mexicanus

Thrushes and allies
Order: PasseriformesFamily: Turdidae

The thrushes are a group of passerine birds that occur mainly in the Old World. They are plump, soft plumaged, small to medium-sized insectivores or sometimes omnivores, often feeding on the ground. Many have attractive songs.

Eastern bluebird, Sialia sialis
Western bluebird, Sialia mexicana
Mountain bluebird, Sialia currucoides
Townsend's solitaire, Myadestes townsendi
Brown-backed solitaire, Myadestes occidentalis
Slate-colored solitaire, Myadestes unicolor
Orange-billed nightingale-thrush, Catharus aurantiirostris
Russet nightingale-thrush, Catharus occidentalis (E)
Ruddy-capped nightingale-thrush, Catharus frantzii
Black-headed nightingale-thrush, Catharus mexicanus
Yellow-throated nightingale-thrush, Catharus dryas
Veery, Catharus fuscescens
Gray-cheeked thrush, Catharus minimus
Swainson's thrush, Catharus ustulatus
Hermit thrush, Catharus guttatus
Wood thrush, Hylocichla mustelina (Near-threatened)
Black thrush, Turdus infuscatus
Mountain thrush, Turdus plebejus
Clay-colored thrush, Turdus grayi
White-throated thrush, Turdus assimilis
Rufous-backed robin, Turdus rufopalliatus (E)
Rufous-collared robin, Turdus rufitorques
American robin, Turdus migratorius
Varied thrush, Ixoreus naevius
Aztec thrush, Ridgwayia pinicola (E)

Old World flycatchers
Order: PasseriformesFamily: Muscicapidae

Old World flycatchers are a large group of small passerine birds native to the Old World. They are mainly small arboreal insectivores. The appearance of these birds is highly varied, but they mostly have weak songs and harsh calls.

Red-flanked bluetail, Tarsiger cyanurus (A)
Northern wheatear, Oenanthe oenanthe (A)

Olive warbler
Order: PasseriformesFamily: Peucedramidae

The olive warbler is a small passerine bird, the only member of the family Peucedramidae. It is a long-winged bird with a gray body and wings with some olive-green and two white bars. The male's head and breast are orange, the female's yellow.

Olive warbler, Peucedramus taeniatus

Waxbills and allies
Order: PasseriformesFamily: Estrildidae

The estrildid finches are small passerine birds of the Old World tropics and Australasia. They are gregarious and often colonial seed eaters with short thick but pointed bills. They are all similar in structure and habits, but have a wide variation in plumage colors and pattern.

Scaly-breasted munia, Lonchura punctulata (I)
Tricolored munia, Lonchura malacca (I)
Chestnut munia, Lonchura atricapilla (I)

Old World sparrows
Order: PasseriformesFamily: Passeridae

Sparrows are small passerine birds. In general, sparrows tend to be small, plump, brown or gray birds with short tails and short powerful beaks. Sparrows are seed eaters, but they also consume small insects.

House sparrow, Passer domesticus (I)

Wagtails and pipits
Order: PasseriformesFamily: Motacillidae

Motacillidae is a family of small passerine birds with medium to long tails. They include the wagtails, longclaws, and pipits. They are slender ground-feeding insectivores of open country.

Eastern yellow wagtail, Motacilla tschutschensis (A)
White wagtail, Motacilla alba (A)
Olive-backed pipit, Anthus hodgsoni (A)
Red-throated pipit, Anthus cervinus (A)
American pipit, Anthus rubescens
Sprague's pipit, Anthus spragueii (Vulnerable)

Finches, euphonias, and allies
Order: PasseriformesFamily: Fringillidae

Finches are seed-eating passerine birds that are small to moderately large and have a strong beak, usually conical and in some species very large. All have twelve tail feathers and nine primaries. These birds have a bouncing flight with alternating bouts of flapping and gliding on closed wings, and most sing well.

Elegant euphonia, Chlorophonia elegantissima
Blue-crowned chlorophonia, Chlorophonia occipitalis
West Mexican euphonia, Euphonia godmani (E)
Scrub euphonia, Euphonia affinis
White-vented euphonia, Euphonia minuta
Yellow-throated euphonia, Euphonia hirundinacea
Olive-backed euphonia, Euphonia gouldi
Hooded grosbeak, Coccothraustes abeillei
Evening grosbeak, Coccothraustes vespertinus (Vulnerable)
House finch, Haemorhous mexicanus
Purple finch, Haemorhous purpureus
Cassin's finch, Haemorhous cassinii
Red crossbill, Loxia curvirostra
Pine siskin, Spinus pinus
Black-capped siskin, Spinus atriceps
Black-headed siskin, Spinus notatus
Lesser goldfinch, Spinus psaltria
Lawrence's goldfinch, Spinus lawrencei
American goldfinch, Spinus tristis

Thrush-tanager
Order: PasseriformesFamily: Rhodinocichlidae

This species was historically placed in family Thraupidae. It was placed in its own family in 2017.

Rosy thrush-tanager, Rhodinocichla rosea

Longspurs and snow buntings
Order: PasseriformesFamily: Calcariidae

The Calcariidae are a group of passerine birds that had been traditionally grouped with the New World sparrows, but differ in a number of respects and are usually found in open grassy areas.

Lapland longspur, Calcarius lapponicus (A)
Chestnut-collared longspur, Calcarius ornatus (Near-threatened)
Thick-billed longspur, Rhynchophanes mccownii

Old World buntings
Order: PasseriformesFamily: Emberizidae

Emberizidae is a family of passerine birds containing a single genus. Until 2017, the New World sparrows (Passerellidae) were also considered part of this family.

Little bunting, Emberiza pusilla (A)

New World sparrows

Order: PasseriformesFamily: Passerellidae

Until 2017, these species were considered part of the family Emberizidae. Most of the species are known as sparrows, but these birds are not closely related to the Old World sparrows which are in the family Passeridae. Many of these have distinctive head patterns.

Common chlorospingus, Chlorospingus flavopectus
Rufous-winged sparrow, Peucaea carpalis
Cinnamon-tailed sparrow, Peucaea sumichrasti (E) (Near-threatened)
Stripe-headed sparrow, Peucaea ruficauda
Black-chested sparrow, Peucaea humeralis (E)
Bridled sparrow, Peucaea mystacalis (E)
Botteri's sparrow, Peucaea botterii
Cassin's sparrow, Peucaea cassinii
Grasshopper sparrow, Ammodramus savannarum
Olive sparrow, Arremonops rufivirgatus
Five-striped sparrow, Amphispizopsis quinquestriata
Green-backed sparrow, Arremonops chloronotus
Black-throated sparrow, Amphispiza bilineata
Lark sparrow, Chondestes grammacus
Lark bunting, Calamospiza melanocorys
Chipping sparrow, Spizella passerina
Clay-colored sparrow, Spizella pallida
Black-chinned sparrow, Spizella atrogularis
Field sparrow, Spizella pusilla
Brewer's sparrow, Spizella breweri
Worthen's sparrow, Spizella wortheni (E) (Endangered)
Orange-billed sparrow, Arremon aurantiirostris
Green-striped brushfinch, Arremon virenticeps (E)
Chestnut-capped brushfinch, Arremon brunneinucha
Fox sparrow, Passerella iliaca
Guadalupe junco, Junco insularis (E) (Endangered)
Dark-eyed junco, Junco hyemalis
Yellow-eyed junco, Junco phaeonotus
Baird's junco, Junco bairdi (E) (Near-threatened)
Rufous-collared sparrow, Zonotrichia capensis
White-crowned sparrow, Zonotrichia leucophrys
Golden-crowned sparrow, Zonotrichia atricapilla
Harris's sparrow, Zonotrichia querula (A) (Near-threatened)
White-throated sparrow, Zonotrichia albicollis
Sagebrush sparrow, Artemisiospiza nevadensis
Bell's sparrow, Artemisiospiza belli
Striped sparrow, Oriturus superciliosus (E)
Vesper sparrow, Pooecetes gramineus
LeConte's sparrow, Ammospiza leconteii (A)
Seaside sparrow, Ammospiza maritima (A)
Nelson's sparrow, Ammospiza nelsoni (A)
Baird's sparrow, Centronyx bairdii
Savannah sparrow, Passerculus sandwichensis
Sierra Madre sparrow, Xenospiza baileyi (E) (Endangered)
Song sparrow, Melospiza melodia
Lincoln's sparrow, Melospiza lincolnii
Swamp sparrow, Melospiza georgiana
Rusty-crowned ground-sparrow, Melozone kieneri (E)
Canyon towhee, Melozone fusca
White-throated towhee, Melozone albicollis (E)
Abert's towhee, Melozone aberti
California towhee, Melozone crissalis
White-eared ground-sparrow, Melozone leucotis
White-faced ground-sparrow, Melozone biarcuata
Rusty sparrow, Aimophila rufescens
Rufous-crowned sparrow, Aimophila ruficeps
Oaxaca sparrow, Aimophila notosticta (E)
Green-tailed towhee, Pipilo chlorurus
Spotted towhee, Pipilo maculatus
Collared towhee, Pipilo ocai (E)
Rufous-capped brushfinch, Atlapetes pileatus (E)
White-naped brushfinch, Atlapetes albinucha

Spindalises
Order: PasseriformesFamily: Spindalidae

The members of this small family are native to the Greater Antilles. One species is common on Cozumel.

Western spindalis, Spindalis zena

Yellow-breasted chat
Order: PasseriformesFamily: Icteriidae

This species was historically placed in the wood-warblers (Parulidae) but nonetheless most authorities were unsure if it belonged there. It was placed in its own family in 2017.

Yellow-breasted chat, Icteria virens

Troupials and allies

Order: PasseriformesFamily: Icteridae

The icterids are a group of small to medium-sized, often colorful, passerine birds restricted to the New World and include the grackles, New World blackbirds, and New World orioles. Most species have black as the predominant plumage color, often enlivened by yellow, orange, or red.

Yellow-headed blackbird, Xanthocephalus xanthocephalus
Bobolink, Dolichonyx oryzivorus (A)
Chihuahuan meadowlark, Sturnella lilianae
Eastern meadowlark, Sturnella magna (Near-threatened)
Western meadowlark, Sturnella neglecta
Yellow-billed cacique, Amblycercus holosericeus
Yellow-winged cacique, Cassiculus melanicterus (E)
Chestnut-headed oropendola, Psarocolius wagleri
Montezuma oropendola, Psarocolius montezuma
Black-vented oriole, Icterus wagleri
Bar-winged oriole, Icterus maculialatus
Black-cowled oriole, Icterus prosthemelas
Orchard oriole, Icterus spurius
Hooded oriole, Icterus cucullatus
Yellow-backed oriole, Icterus chrysater
Yellow-tailed oriole, Icterus mesomelas
Streak-backed oriole, Icterus pustulatus
Bullock's oriole, Icterus bullockii
Orange oriole, Icterus auratus (E)
Spot-breasted oriole, Icterus pectoralis
Altamira oriole, Icterus gularis
Audubon's oriole, Icterus graduacauda
Baltimore oriole, Icterus galbula
Black-backed oriole, Icterus abeillei (E)
Scott's oriole, Icterus parisorum
Red-winged blackbird, Agelaius phoeniceus
Tricolored blackbird, Agelaius tricolor (Endangered)
Shiny cowbird, Molothrus bonariensis (A)
Bronzed cowbird, Molothrus aeneus
Brown-headed cowbird, Molothrus ater
Giant cowbird, Molothrus oryzivorus
Melodious blackbird, Dives dives
Rusty blackbird, Euphagus carolinus (A) (Vulnerable)
Brewer's blackbird, Euphagus cyanocephalus
Common grackle, Quiscalus quiscula (A) (Near-threatened)
Great-tailed grackle, Quiscalus mexicanus
Slender-billed grackle, Quiscalus palustris (E) (Extinct)

New World warblers

Order: PasseriformesFamily: Parulidae

The New World warblers are a group of small, often colorful, passerine birds restricted to the New World. Most are arboreal, but some are terrestrial. Most members of this family are insectivores. Mexico has the greatest diversity of New World warblers on earth.

Ovenbird, Seiurus aurocapilla
Worm-eating warbler, Helmitheros vermivorum
Louisiana waterthrush, Parkesia motacilla
Northern waterthrush, Parkesia noveboracensis
Golden-winged warbler, Vermivora chrysoptera
Blue-winged warbler, Vermivora cyanoptera (Near-threatened)
Black-and-white warbler, Mniotilta varia
Prothonotary warbler, Protonotaria citrea
Swainson's warbler, Limnothlypis swainsonii
Crescent-chested warbler, Leiothlypis superciliosa
Tennessee warbler, Leiothlypis peregrina
Orange-crowned warbler, Leiothlypis celata
Colima warbler, Leiothlypis crissalis
Lucy's warbler, Leiothlypis luciae
Nashville warbler, Leiothlypis ruficapilla
Virginia's warbler, Leiothlypis virginiae
Connecticut warbler, Oporornis agilis (A)
Gray-crowned yellowthroat, Geothlypis poliocephala
MacGillivray's warbler, Geothlypis tolmiei
Mourning warbler, Geothlypis philadelphia
Kentucky warbler, Geothlypis formosa
Black-polled yellowthroat, Geothlypis speciosa (E) (Endangered)
Belding's yellowthroat, Geothlypis beldingi (E) (Endangered)
Altamira yellowthroat, Geothlypis flavovelata (E) (Vulnerable)
Common yellowthroat, Geothlypis trichas
Hooded yellowthroat, Geothlypis nelsoni (E)
Hooded warbler, Setophaga citrina
American redstart, Setophaga ruticilla
Cape May warbler, Setophaga tigrina
Cerulean warbler, Setophaga cerulea (Vulnerable)
Northern parula, Setophaga americana
Tropical parula, Setophaga pitiayumi
Magnolia warbler, Setophaga magnolia
Bay-breasted warbler, Setophaga castanea
Blackburnian warbler, Setophaga fusca
Yellow warbler, Setophaga petechia
Chestnut-sided warbler, Setophaga pensylvanica
Blackpoll warbler, Setophaga striata (A)
Black-throated blue warbler, Setophaga caerulescens
Palm warbler, Setophaga palmarum
Pine warbler, Setophaga pinus (A)
Yellow-rumped warbler, Setophaga coronata
Yellow-throated warbler, Setophaga dominica
Prairie warbler, Setophaga discolor
Grace's warbler, Setophaga graciae
Black-throated gray warbler, Setophaga nigrescens
Townsend's warbler, Setophaga townsendi
Hermit warbler, Setophaga occidentalis
Golden-cheeked warbler, Setophaga chrysoparia (Endangered)
Black-throated green warbler, Setophaga virens
Fan-tailed warbler, Basileuterus lachrymosus
Rufous-capped warbler, Basileuterus rufifrons
Chestnut-capped warbler, Basileuterus delattrii
Golden-browed warbler, Basileuterus belli
Golden-crowned warbler, Basileuterus culicivorus
Canada warbler, Cardellina canadensis
Wilson's warbler, Cardellina pusilla
Red-faced warbler, Cardellina rubrifrons
Red warbler, Cardellina rubra (E)
Pink-headed warbler, Cardellina versicolor (Vulnerable)
Painted redstart, Myioborus pictus
Slate-throated redstart, Myioborus miniatus

Cardinals and allies

Order: PasseriformesFamily: Cardinalidae

The cardinals are a family of robust, seed-eating birds with strong bills. They are typically associated with open woodland. The sexes usually have distinct plumages. Mexico has the greatest diversity of this family of any country.

Rose-throated tanager, Piranga roseogularis
Hepatic tanager, Piranga flava
Summer tanager, Piranga rubra
Scarlet tanager, Piranga olivacea
Western tanager, Piranga ludoviciana
Flame-colored tanager, Piranga bidentata
White-winged tanager, Piranga leucoptera
Red-headed tanager, Piranga erythrocephala (E)
Red-crowned ant-tanager, Habia rubica
Red-throated ant-tanager, Habia fuscicauda
Black-faced grosbeak, Caryothraustes poliogaster
Crimson-collared grosbeak, Rhodothraupis celaeno (E)
Northern cardinal, Cardinalis cardinalis
Pyrrhuloxia, Cardinalis sinuatus
Yellow grosbeak, Pheucticus chrysopeplus
Rose-breasted grosbeak, Pheucticus ludovicianus
Black-headed grosbeak, Pheucticus melanocephalus
Red-breasted chat, Granatellus venustus (E)
Gray-throated chat, Granatellus sallaei
Blue seedeater, Amaurospiza concolor
Blue-black grosbeak, Cyanoloxia cyanoides
Blue bunting, Cyanocompsa parellina
Blue grosbeak, Passerina caerulea
Lazuli bunting, Passerina amoena
Indigo bunting, Passerina cyanea
Rose-bellied bunting, Passerina rositae (E) (Near-threatened)
Orange-breasted bunting, Passerina leclancherii (E)
Varied bunting, Passerina versicolor
Painted bunting, Passerina ciris (Near-threatened)
Dickcissel, Spiza americana

Tanagers and allies

Order: PasseriformesFamily: Thraupidae

The tanagers are a large group of small to medium-sized passerine birds restricted to the New World, mainly in the tropics. Many species are brightly colored. As a family they are omnivorous, but individual species specialize in eating fruits, seeds, insects, or other types of food. Most have short, rounded wings.

Azure-rumped tanager, Poecilostreptus cabanisi (Endangered)
Golden-hooded tanager, Stilpnia larvata
Blue-gray tanager, Thraupis episcopus
Yellow-winged tanager, Thraupis abbas
Grassland yellow-finch, Sicalis luteola
Slaty finch, Haplospiza rustica (A)
Cinnamon-bellied flowerpiercer, Diglossa baritula
Green honeycreeper, Chlorophanes spiza
Blue-black grassquit, Volatinia jacarina
Gray-headed tanager, Eucometis penicillata
Black-throated shrike-tanager, Lanio aurantius
Crimson-collared tanager, Ramphocelus sanguinolentus
Scarlet-rumped tanager, Ramphocelus passerinii
Shining honeycreeper, Cyanerpes lucidus (A)
Red-legged honeycreeper, Cyanerpes cyaneus
Bananaquit, Coereba flaveola
Yellow-faced grassquit, Tiaris olivacea
Thick-billed seed-finch, Sporophila funereus
Variable seedeater, Sporophila corvina
Slate-colored seedeater, Sporophila schistacea (A)
Cinnamon-rumped seedeater, Sporophila torqueola (E)
Morelet's seedeater, Sporophila morelleti
Ruddy-breasted seedeater, Sporophila minuta
Buff-throated saltator, Saltator maximus
Black-headed saltator, Saltator atriceps
Cinnamon-bellied saltator, Saltator grandis
Blue-gray saltator, Saltator coerulescens

See also
List of birds
Lists of birds by region

References

External links
Birds of Mexico and its states - World Institute for Conservation and Environment

Mexico